The Groundwork Theory is Christian rap artist Verbs's fourth album. It was released on new label 1280 Music in 2007. He released it under the name Knowdaverbs.

Track listing
 I Yie!
 Better Not Fall For That! (featuring Theory Hazit and Josiah Bell)
 Be Still (featuring The Light)
 Stay Fresh
 New Day (featuring Syntyst)
 Future
 I Know
 Glow
 Light My Life Up
 Mutual
 Soundman
 Let's Live
 Be Still (Reprise)
 News Flash

2007 albums
Verbs (rapper) albums